The 2021–22 Ghana Women's Premier League (GWPL) is the top division league for women. The league was launched in 2012 and the 2021–22 is set to be its 9th season. Ampem Darkoa Ladies were crowned champions after beating Hasaacas Ladies 5–3 on penalty after 1–1 draw after extra time during the Championship final.

Season Overview 
In 2021, the Executive Council of the Ghana Football Association (GFA) decided to expand the League from its current format 16 Clubs to 18 Clubs beginning from this season, meaning nine teams for the respective zones to allow for a minimum of 16 league matches in a season. The league as usual is set to be played in two zones: the Northern Zone and the Southern Zone. Winners of the northern and southern zones then meet in a championship final to declare the champions for the season. The season for 2021–2022 was set to kick off in late 2021.

Faith Ladies FC, Army Ladies FC were promoted from the southern zone Division One League and Savannah ladies and Dreamz Ladies FC were promoted from the northern zone.

Teams

Stadiums and locations 
Note: Table lists in alphabetical order.

Club managers and captains 
Note: Table lists in alphabetical order.

League table

Northern Zone 

Source: Ghana Football Association

Southern Zone 

Source: Ghana Football Association

Championship final

Statistics

Top scorers

Awards

Monthly awards 
The monthly awards were sponsored by NASCO Ghana.

Annual awards 
The annual awards were given at the end of the season.

See also 

 Women's football in Ghana
 Ghana Women's FA Cup
 2021–22 Ghana Premier League

References

External links 

 Official Website

2021–22 in Ghanaian football
2022 in Ghanaian sport
2021–22 domestic women's association football leagues